Jothi Agaval - The Call Divine is a poem by Ramalinga Swamigal (Vallalar).

Thiru Arutprakasa wrote about it in 1874.

References

 complete compilation of Thiruvarutpa in all six thirumurai at Annamalai University Library
 Vallars Recitals
 VALLALAR AGAVAL SONGS

Tamil-language literature
Hindu literature